U.S. Highway 52 (US 52) is a  United States Numbered Highway in the U.S. state of North Dakota, which travels from the Canada–United States border east to the Red River at Fargo. The highway connects the cities of Minot and Fargo and travels concurrent with Interstate 94 (I-94) between Jamestown and the Minnesota state line.

Route description
US 52 passes through Burke, Ward, Renville, McHenry, Pierce, Sheridan, Wells, Foster, Stutsman, Barnes, and Cass counties.

US 52 is a two-lane highway in most areas, except for four lane segments between the Burlington area and Minot, Jamestown and Buchanan, and Jamestown and Fargo.  Some segments in Fargo are six lanes.

From a point halfway between Foxholm and Burlington, and the southeast edge of Minot, US 52 is co-signed with US 2. As US 2/US 52 passes through the south part of Minot, it intersects with the US 83 Bypass, and then US 83 itself. The route through Jamestown follows 5th St. NW, 1st Ave., and I-94 Business Loop (the signs previously followed the eastern half, but now follow the shorter western half). From Jamestown east to the Minnesota border at Fargo, the highway is co-signed with Interstate 94.

History

Major intersections

See also

References

External links

 North Dakota
52
Transportation in Burke County, North Dakota
Transportation in Ward County, North Dakota
Transportation in Renville County, North Dakota
Transportation in McHenry County, North Dakota
Transportation in Benson County, North Dakota
Transportation in Wells County, North Dakota
Transportation in Foster County, North Dakota
Transportation in Stutsman County, North Dakota
Transportation in Barnes County, North Dakota
Transportation in Cass County, North Dakota